Madinnagoda Grama Niladhari Division is a  Grama Niladhari Division of the  Kolonnawa Divisional Secretariat  of Colombo District  of Western Province, Sri Lanka .  It has Grama Niladhari Division Code 513B.

Madinnagoda is a surrounded by the  Kotuwegoda, Elhena, Kalapaluwawa, Gothatuwa and Welikada East  Grama Niladhari Divisions.

Demographics

Ethnicity 

The Madinnagoda Grama Niladhari Division has  a Sinhalese majority (95.2%) . In comparison, the Kolonnawa Divisional Secretariat (which contains the Madinnagoda Grama Niladhari Division) has  a Sinhalese majority (67.4%) and a significant Moor population (21.4%)

Religion 

The Madinnagoda Grama Niladhari Division has  a Buddhist majority (90.6%) . In comparison, the Kolonnawa Divisional Secretariat (which contains the Madinnagoda Grama Niladhari Division) has  a Buddhist majority (64.6%) and a significant Muslim population (23.1%)

References 

Grama Niladhari Divisions of Kolonnawa Divisional Secretariat